Joseph Armstrong DeLaine (July 2, 1898 – August 3, 1974) was a Methodist minister and civil rights leader from Clarendon County, South Carolina. He received a B.A. from Allen University in 1931, working as a laborer and running a dry cleaning business to pay for his education. DeLaine worked with Modjeska Simkins and the South Carolina NAACP on the case Briggs v. Elliott, which  challenged segregation in Summerton, South Carolina.

DeLaine decided to leave South Carolina, and never returned, after a warrant was issued for his arrest for returning gunfire when his parsonage later came under hostile gunfire. He fled first to New York City and then to Buffalo, New York, where he founded another Methodist church. As a result of efforts begun in 1955, DeLaine was pardoned in 2000 by the South Carolina State Parole Board.

DeLaine also memorably taught school in South Carolina, and in 2006 was inducted into South Carolina's Educational Hall of Honor at the University of South Carolina.

Rev. DeLaine and three other plaintiffs in the Briggs v. Elliott case were posthumously awarded Congressional gold medals in 2004 for their courage and persistence despite repeated acts of domestic violence against them.

In popular culture
Playwright Loften Mitchell wrote a 1963 play based on DeLaine's story titled Land Beyond the River.

Actor Ossie Davis also wrote a short play, The People of Clarendon County, which starred himself, his wife, Ruby Dee, and Sidney Poitier. It was featured, as was the case predating Brown v. Board of Education in which DeLaine played an important role, in Alice Bernstein's illustrated book with the same title.

External links
 Rev. Joseph A. DeLaine in South Carolina African American History Online
 Rev. Joseph A. DeLaine's Papers  South Carolina's South Caroliniana Library and Digital Collections
 Alice Bernstein, The People of Clarendon County (2007 - ), https://www.amazon.com/People-Clarendon-County-Ossie-Davis/dp/0883782871/ref=sr_1_1?s=books&ie=UTF8&qid=1381767028&sr=1-1&keywords=0883782871
 

African-American Methodist clergy
American Methodist clergy
Activists for African-American civil rights
Congressional Gold Medal recipients
People from Clarendon County, South Carolina
Allen University alumni
1898 births
1974 deaths
20th-century American clergy
African-American activists
Religious leaders from South Carolina
Activists from South Carolina
20th-century Methodist ministers